Objection Overruled is a 1993 heavy metal album by the German band Accept. The phrase may also refer to:

 "Objection overruled", a statement by a judge who disagrees with a formal protest raised in court during a trial.
 "Objection Overruled" (song), a 1990 thrash metal song by the US band Exodus